Art cinemas, or independent movie theaters, in New York City are known for showing art house, independent, revival, and foreign films.

Manhattan
City Cinemas Angelika Film Center
 Anthology Film Archives
 Cinéma Village
 City Cinemas Cinemas 1, 2 & 3
 DCTV Cinema
 Film Forum
 Film Society of Lincoln Center
 The Film-Makers' Coop
 French Institute Alliance Française
 IFC Center
 Metrograph
 Museum of Modern Art
 The Paris Theater, now leased by Netflix
 Quad Cinema
 Roxy Cinema
 Village East by Angelika

Former theaters
 8th Street Playhouse
 Beekman Theatre
 Bleecker Street Cinema
 City Cinemas Beekman Theatre
 Fine Arts Theatre
 Lincoln Plaza Cinemas
 Landmark Sunshine Cinema
 Thalia Theatre
 Tribeca Cinemas
 Ziegfeld Theatre (1969)
 The Landmark at 57 West

Brooklyn
 Cobble Hill Cinemas
 Nitehawk Cinema
 BAM Rose Cinemas
 Spectacle Theater
 Light Industry
 Stuart Cinema & Cafe
 e-flux Screening Room

Former theaters
 reRun Gastropub Theater
 indieScreen
 Videology Bar & Cinema

Queens
 Kew Gardens Cinemas
 Museum of the Moving Image

See also

 List of theaters in New York
 Culture of New York City

References

Lists of cinemas
New York City-related lists
Cinemas and movie theaters in New York City